Hearst (René Fontaine) Municipal Airport (Aéroport municipale de Hearst Municipal Airport) , named after René Fontaine, is located  northwest of Hearst, Ontario, Canada.

The airport is owned by the Town of Hearst and day-to-day operations managed by Commercial Aviation since the 1980s.

Facilities

The airport has a few structures, namely a small shed, hangar and terminal building.

There are two helipads located next to the terminal.

Transportation

The airport is accessible by car only. Airport Road provides access to the airport and connects to Highway 11/Trans Canada Highway via Fontaine Drive. A small parking lot is located next to the terminal building.

See also
Hearst/Carey Lake Water Aerodrome

References

External link
 Hearst Airport

Registered aerodromes in Cochrane District